Barak Bakhar (born 21 September 1979) is an Israeli association football manager and former footballer. He is the head coach of Israeli Premier League champions Maccabi Haifa.

Early and personal life
Bakhar was born in moshav Tzrufa, Israel, to a Turkish-born father of both Sephardi Jewish and Mizrahi Jewish descent, and to an Israeli-born mother of Ashkenazi Jewish (Polish-Jewish) descent. His uncle was the Israeli Minister of Tourism Rehavam "Gandhi" Ze'evi, who was assassinated by Palestinian terrorists in 2001.

He is married, has three children, and resides in Holon, Israel.

Playing career
After going through the ranks of the youth system of Neve Yosef, Bakhar transferred to Liga Artzit side, Hakoah Ramat Gan. After four seasons in the second tier of Israeli football, he made the jump to Hapoel Petah Tikva.

In 2004, Bakhar joined Liga Leumit side, Ironi Kiryat Shmona. He established himself in the starting line up on the right side of their defense and helped them gain promotion to Israeli Premier League, the highest tier of Israeli football. During the 2007–08 season, Bakhar played all but one league match for Kiryat Shmona, due to yellow card accumulation.

In October 2008, Bakhar was called up by national team manager, Dror Kashtan for the FIFA World Cup qualification matches against Luxembourg and Latvia. His call up was canceled though, being that he never completed his service in the IDF, a requirement of all Jewish players in order to represent Israel on the national side, and Eyal Meshumar was called up in his place.

Bakhar cited that the IDF did not suit him as to why he did not complete his service. He told Israeli Yedioth Ahronoth, "they wanted to send me to a combat unit in the armor corps." Additionally, Sport 5 pointed out that Bakhar was not match fit and was expected to undergo surgery soon. This in turn embarrassed the Israel Football Association that they had missed all these items before announcing the pool of players called in for the qualification matches

Managerial career
On 3 October 2012, Bakhar was appointed as the manager of Hapoel Ironi Kiryat Shmona. On 14 May 2015, he ended his contract. In the 2015–16 season, he was appointed of manager of Hapoel Be'er Sheva. He got Be'er Sheva to win the Israeli League for the first time in forty years after a 3–1 win against Bnei Sachnin. By winning the league, Be'er Sheva got in the UEFA Champions League for the first time and will start in the second qualifying round. He got Be'er Sheva into the third qualifying round of 2016–17 UEFA Champions League in a 3–2 win on aggregate against Sheriff Tiraspol. Then, he got Be'er Sheva secured a Europa League group stage position by stunning Greek side Olympiacos 1–0 on aggregate, the furthest they ever reached. In the playoff qualifying round of the UEFA Champions League, Badkar's Be'er Sheva lost 5–4 on aggregate to Celtic despite winning 2–0 at Turner Stadium. In the 2016–17 UEFA Europa League, Be'er Sheva made it in the round of 32 in the Europa League in second place behind Sparta Prague in Group K by getting famous results against Southampton and Inter Milan. Bakhar also won the Toto Cup for Be'er Sheva on 28 December 2016 beating his former club Hapoel Ironi Kiryat Shmona 4–1. 

In 2022, Bakhar led Maccabi Haifa to the group stages of the Champions League for the first time in thirteen years after qualifying victories over Olympiakos, Apollon Limassol and former European Champions Red Star Belgrade.

Managerial statistics
As of 18 March 2023

Honours

As a player
Hakoah Maccabi Ramat Gan
 Israel Toto Cup Artzit: 1998–99

Ironi Kiryat Shmona
 Israeli Liga Leumit: 2006–07
 Israel Toto Cup Leumit: 2006–07
 Israel Toto Cup Al: 2010–11

As a manager
 Israel State Cup: 2014
 Israeli Premier League: 2015–16, 2016–17, 2017–18, 2020–21, 2021–22
 Israel Super Cup: 2016, 2017, 2021
 Israel Toto Cup: 2021–22

See also 

 List of Jewish footballers
 Football in Israel#Title Holders
 List of Jews in sports
 List of Jews in sports (non-players)
 List of Israelis

References

External links 
 Barak Bakhar's profile on Ironi Kiryat Shmona's official website
 

1979 births
Living people
Israeli Ashkenazi Jews
Israeli Sephardi Jews
Israeli Mizrahi Jews
Israeli Jews
Jewish sportspeople
Israeli footballers
Hakoah Maccabi Ramat Gan F.C. players
Hapoel Petah Tikva F.C. players
Hapoel Ironi Kiryat Shmona F.C. players
People from Tzrufa
Liga Leumit players
Israeli Premier League players
Israeli football managers
Hapoel Ironi Kiryat Shmona F.C. managers
Hapoel Be'er Sheva F.C. managers
Maccabi Haifa F.C. managers
Israeli Premier League managers
Association football defenders
Israeli people of Turkish-Jewish descent
Israeli people of Polish-Jewish descent